M103 or M-103 may refer to:

M103 heavy tank, an American heavy tank
M103 (New York City bus), a bus route in Manhattan
M-103 (Michigan highway), a state highway in Michigan
Mercedes-Benz M103 engine
Messier 103, an open star cluster in the constellation Cassiopeia
The ADC ID of Lyndonville Air Force Station
Motion 103, also known as M-103; a motion in the House of Commons of Canada.
M103 railway (Croatia), railway line in Croatia